Anderson Site may refer to:

Anderson Site (Stanton, Kentucky), listed on the National Register of Historic Places in Powell County, Kentucky
Anderson Site (Franklin, Tennessee)

See also
Anderson House (disambiguation)